Pope Gregory XVI (born Bartolomeo Alberto Cappellari; 18 September 1765 – 1 June 1846) was head of the Catholic Church and ruler of the Papal States from 2 February 1831 to his death in 1 June 1846. He had adopted the name Mauro upon entering the religious order of the Camaldolese.

Strongly conservative and traditionalist, he opposed democratic and modernising reforms in the Papal States and throughout Europe, seeing them as fronts for revolutionary leftism. Against these trends, Gregory XVI sought to strengthen the religious and political authority of the papacy, a position known as ultramontanism. In the encyclical Mirari vos, he pronounced it "false and absurd, or rather mad, that we must secure and guarantee to each one liberty of conscience." He encouraged missionary activity abroad and condemned the slave trade.

He is the most recent pope to take the pontifical name "Gregory", and the most recent pope who was not a bishop when elected. Until the accession of Pope Francis in 2013, he was the most recent pope to have been a priest of a religious order.

Biography

Early life
Bartolomeo Alberto Cappellari was born at Belluno in the Republic of Venice, on 18 September 1765, to an Italian lower noble family. His parents were from a small village named Pesariis, in Friuli. His father was a lawyer. At the age of eighteen Bartolomeo Cappellari joined the order of the Camaldolese (part of the Benedictine monastic family) and entered the Monastery of San Michele in Murano, near Venice. He was ordained a priest in 1787. As a Camaldolese monk, Cappellari rapidly gained distinction for his theological and linguistic skills, and was assigned to teach philosophy and theology at San Michele in 1787, at the age of 22.

In 1790, at the age of 25, he was appointed censor librorum for his Order, as well as for the Holy Office at Venice. He went to Rome in 1795 and in 1799 published a polemic against the Italian Jansenists titled II Trionfo della Santa Sede ("The Triumph of the Holy See"), which passed through various editions in Italy and was translated into several European languages. In 1800 he became a member of the Academy of the Catholic Religion, founded by Pope Pius VII (1800–1823), to which he contributed memoirs on theological and philosophical questions. In 1805, at the age of 40, he was appointed abbot of the Monastery of San Gregorio on Rome's Caelian Hill.

When the army of the French Emperor Napoleon took Rome and arrested and deported Pius VII to France in 1809, Cappellari fled to Murano, where he taught in the Monastery of St. Michele of his Order, where he had first become a monk. From there he and a group of monks moved their little college to Padua in 1814. After Napoleon's final defeat, the Congress of Vienna re-established the sovereignty of the Papal States over central Italy and Cappellari was called back to Rome to assume the post of vicar general of the Camaldolese Order. He was then appointed as Counsellor to the Inquisition, and later promoted to be Consultor (29 February 1820) and then, on 1 October 1826, Prefect of the Congregation of Propaganda Fide ("Propagation of the Faith"), which dealt with all missionary work outside of the Spanish Empire, including missions to the non-Catholic states in Europe. Twice he was offered a bishopric and twice he refused.

Cardinal

On 21 March 1825, Cappellari was created cardinal in pectore (published 13 March 1826) by Pope Leo XII, and shortly afterwards he was asked to negotiate a concordat to safeguard the rights of Catholics in the Low Countries, a diplomatic task which he completed successfully. He also negotiated a peace on behalf of Armenian Catholics with the Ottoman Empire. He publicly condemned the Polish revolutionaries, who he thought were seeking to undermine Russian Tsar Nicholas I's efforts to support the Catholic royalist cause in France by forcing him to divert his troops to suppress the uprising in Poland.

Cappellari had never travelled outside Italy and was most familiar with Venice and Rome. He spoke Italian and Latin fluently, but no other European languages, and did not understand European politics. However, he was proficient in Armenian, and Haruti'iwn Awgerian (Pascal Aucher)'s 1827 Venice edition of works attributed to Severian of Gabala and translated into Armenian was dedicated to him.

Pontificate

Papal election

On 2 February 1831, after a fifty-day conclave, Cappellari was unexpectedly chosen to succeed Pope Pius VIII (1829–30). His election was influenced by the fact that the cardinal considered the most papabile, Giacomo Giustiniani, was vetoed by King Ferdinand VII of Spain. There then arose a deadlock between the other two major candidates, Emmanuele De Gregorio and Bartolomeo Pacca.  What finally drove the cardinals to make a decision was a message from the Duke of Parma notifying them that revolt was about to break out in the northern Papal States. To resolve the impasse, the cardinals turned to Cappellari, but it took eighty-three ballots for the canonically required two-thirds majority to be reached.

At the time of election, Cardinal Cappellari was not yet a bishop: he is the most recent man to be elected pope prior to his episcopal consecration. He was consecrated as bishop by Bartolomeo Pacca, Cardinal Bishop of Ostia and Velletri and dean of the Sacred College of Cardinals, with Pietro Francesco Galleffi, Cardinal Bishop of Porto e Santa Rufina and sub-dean of the Sacred College of Cardinals, and Tommasso Arezzo, Cardinal Bishop of Sabina, acting as co-consecrators.

The choice of Gregory XVI as his regnal name was influenced by the fact that he had been abbot of the Monastery of San Gregorio on the Coelian Hill for more than twenty years, and in honour of Gregory XV, the founder of the Congregation for the Propaganda (Propagation of the Faith). The Monastery of S. Gregorio was the same abbey from which Pope Gregory I had dispatched missionaries to England in 596.

Actions

The revolution of 1830, which overthrew the House of Bourbon, had just inflicted a severe blow on the Catholic royalist party in France.  Almost the first act of the new French government was to seize Ancona, thus throwing Italy, and particularly the Papal States, into a state of confusion and political upheaval.  In the course of the struggle that ensued, it was more than once necessary to call in Austrian troops to fight the red-shirted republicans engaged in a guerrilla campaign. The conservative administration of the Papal States postponed their promised reforms after a series of bombings and assassination attempts.  The replacement of Tommaso Bernetti by Luigi Lambruschini as Cardinal Secretary of State in 1836 did nothing to appease the situation.

In the northern territories the leaders of the revolt were middle-class gentry opposed to the general inefficiency of the government.

Governance of the papal states
Gregory XVI and Cardinal Lambruschini opposed basic technological innovations such as gas lighting and railways, believing that they would promote commerce and increase the power of the bourgeoisie, leading to demands for liberal reforms which would undermine the monarchical power of the Pope over central Italy. Gregory XVI in fact banned railways in the Papal States, calling them chemins d'enfer ("road to hell", a play on the French for railroad, chemin de fer, literally "iron road").

The insurrections at Viterbo in 1836, in various parts of the Legations in 1840, at Ravenna in 1843 and at Rimini in 1845, were followed by wholesale executions and draconian sentences of hard labour and exile, but they did not bring the unrest within the Papal States under the control of the authorities.  Gregory XVI made great expenditures for defensive, architectural and engineering works, having a monument to Pope Leo XII built by Giuseppe Fabris in 1837. He also lavished patronage on such scholars as Angelo Mai, Giuseppe Mezzofanti, and Gaetano Moroni.  This largesse, however, significantly weakened the finances of the Papal States.

Condemnation of the slave trade

In 1839, Gregory XVI issued an apostolic letter against the Atlantic slave trade, In supremo apostolatus, in which he wrote:

Other activities

Encyclicals

Other important encyclicals issued by Pope Gregory XVI were Sollicitudo ecclesiarum, which stated that in the event of a change of government, the church would negotiate with the new government for placement of bishops and vacant dioceses (issued 1831); Mirari Vos, on liberalism and religious indifferentism (issued on 15 August 1832); Quo graviora, on the Pragmatic Constitution in the Rhineland (issued on 4 October 1833); Singulari Nos, on the ideas of Hugues Félicité Robert de Lamennais (issued on 25 June 1834), and Commissum divinitus (17 May 1835) on church and state.

Canonizations and beatifications
Gregory XVI canonized Veronica Giuliani, an Italian mystic, during his papacy. During his reign, five saints were canonized (notably Alphonsus Liguori) and thirty-three Servants of God were declared Blessed (including the Augustinian Simon of Cascia). In addition, many new religious orders were founded or supported and the devotion of the faithful to the Blessed Virgin Mary increased, both in private and public life.

Consistories

The pope created 75 cardinals in 24 consistories, in which the pope elevated 35 cardinals "in pectore", including his future successor Giovanni Maria Mastai-Ferretti, who became Pope Pius IX. The pope also created six additional cardinals in pectore, though the pope died before these names could be revealed, therefore cancelling their appointments to the cardinalate.

In 1836, the pope wanted to nominate Charles Joseph Benoît Mercy d'Argenteau to the College of Cardinals, but the archbishop refused the nomination because he did not wish to leave his family and home for a possible position in the Roman Curia. Gregory XVI nominated four in pectore cardinals on 21 April 1845 and one on 24 November 1845; Gregory XVI also named another in pectore cardinal in the 12 July 1841 consistory, never revealing his name. According to Philippe Boutry, Alerame Maria Pallavicini (the Master of the Sacred Palace) was the in pectore cardinal announced on 24 November 1845, however, Pope Pius IX refused to publish his name upon his ascension to the papacy less than a year later.

Death and burial
On 20 May 1846, he felt himself failing in health. A few days later, he was taken ill with facial erysipelas. At first, the attack was not thought to be very serious, but on 31 May, his strength suddenly failed, and it was seen that the end was near.

Gregory XVI died on 1 June 1846 at 9:15 AM at age 80. That morning, he received the Extreme Unction from the sub-sacristan Agostino Proja. After his funeral, he was buried in Saint Peter's Basilica.

See also
 Cardinals created by Gregory XVI
 List of encyclicals of Pope Gregory XVI
 1832 Rothschild loan to the Holy See
 Ludovico Morbioli
List of popes

References

Sources
 (critical)

 
 

  (laudatory)

 

 
 Regoli, Roberto, "Gregorio XVI: una ricerca historiografica," Archivum Historiae Pontificiae 44 (2006), pp. 141–171. (laudatory)

 (laudatory)

External links

 
1765 births
1846 deaths
People from Belluno
Italian popes
Camaldolese Order
Italian Benedictines
Benedictine abbots
Benedictine bishops
Benedictine popes
Members of the Congregation for the Propagation of the Faith
18th-century Italian people
19th-century Italian people
19th-century popes
Burials at St. Peter's Basilica
Popes